Solar cell phone chargers use solar panels to charge cell phone batteries. They can be used when no electricity supply is available—either mains or, for example, a vehicle battery—and are sometimes suggested as a way to charge phones without consuming mains electricity, unlike electrical cell phone chargers. Some can also be used as a conventional charger by plugging into an electrical outlet. Some chargers have an internal rechargeable battery which is charged in sunlight and then used to charge a phone; others charge the phone directly.

There are also public solar chargers for mobile phones which can be installed permanently in public places such as streets, park and squares. One such is the Strawberry Tree public solar charger.

One cell phone model was reported in 2010 to have a built in solar charger. Solar chargers are commercially available for cellphones.

Solar cell phone chargers come in different shapes and configurations including folding (Goal Zero, Endless Sun Solar) and types that unfold like petals (Solio).

They also come in the form of straps, with solar cells on the outer surface and a rechargeable battery inside.  Solar cell technology limits the effectiveness and practicality of phone solar chargers for everyday use.  Phone charge times vary depending on the solar panel size and efficiency, or the battery capacity of models with batteries, further extending the charge times of solar chargers. The fold-out design provides a larger solar panel, hence higher charge current, and is compact when not in use.

Solar chargers can be used to charge other rechargeable devices with requirements similar to a mobile phone, such as Bluetooth headsets and music players.

Solar chargers used to charge a phone directly, rather than by using an internal battery, can damage a phone if the output is not well-controlled,  for example by supplying excessive voltage in bright sunlight. In less bright light, although there is electrical output it may be too low to support charging, it will not just charge slower.

Some of these chargers are flexible and some can also power solar coolers.

See also 

 Street Charge

Gallery

References 

Applications of photovoltaics